Dick Bruna (born Hendrik Magdalenus Bruna, 23 August 1927 – 16 February 2017) was a Dutch author, artist, illustrator and graphic designer.

Bruna was best known for his children's books which he authored and illustrated, numbering over 200. His most notable creation was Miffy (Nijntje in the original Dutch), a small rabbit drawn with heavy graphic lines, simple shapes and primary colours. Bruna also created stories for characters such as Lottie, Farmer John, and Hettie Hedgehog.

Aside from his prolific catalog of children's books, Bruna also illustrated and designed book covers, posters and promotional materials for his father's publishing company A.W. Bruna & Zoon. His most popular designs graced the covers of the  series of books. Well known among his designs are those for Simenon's Maigret books, typified by graphic silhouettes of a pipe on various backgrounds.

Biography 
Dick Bruna's father, A. W. Bruna, directed the family-owned publishing company Bruna, with his brother Henk Bruna. His father's intentions were for Bruna to follow in his footsteps, but Bruna had different plans and wanted to be an artist. He traveled to London and lived for a while in Paris, where he fell under the influence of Fernand Léger, Pablo Picasso, and especially Henri Matisse. Back in the Netherlands he attended the Rijksakademie van beeldende kunsten in Amsterdam but soon quit; he said afterwards that he had no talent as a painter and could not draw perspective.

In 1955, while on family holiday, he saw a rabbit hopping around and later made attempts to draw it, thereby creating "Nijntje" ("Miffy" in English), the word a Dutch child might use as the diminutive for "konijntje", "little rabbit".

Bruna illustrated over 2,000 covers and over 100 posters for the family business, A.W. Bruna & Zoon. But when the Amsterdam company Art Unlimited decided to publish Poster & Postcards following Roby Bellemans traveling international exhibitions with Dutch and other children book illustrators, Dick Bruna approached Roby about this collaboration and decided to let Art Unlimited publish his “Nijntje” cards.  
His most recognized illustrations were for the Zwarte Beertjes (English: little black bears) series of books, including The Saint, James Bond, Simenon, and Shakespeare. He has said that the Japanese character Hello Kitty was copied from Miffy.

In 2014, Bruna announced his retirement, after which the rights to the Miffy character were not to be sold.  In March 2016 he was awarded the Max Velthuijs-prijs.

Bruna died of natural causes in his sleep in Utrecht on 16 February 2017 at the age of 89.

Bibliography (as children's author) 

Bruna published 120 children's book titles, the last being Miffy is Naughty in 2017.

Influences 

At a young age Bruna started drawing, but was also influenced by artists of other art forms. He drew covers for his school newspaper in Walt Disney style. Later he admired Rembrandt and Van Gogh.

The biggest influence was perhaps Matisse. Dick Bruna's first works were based on collages by the French painter. Bruna has also been noted to have been influenced by the Dutch graphic design movement, De Stijl, in particular the work of architect Gerrit Rietveld.

Partial list of biographies and monographs

References

External links
 Official Miffy site
 Video portrait and interview with Dick Bruna (Dutch Profiles)
 Dick Bruna Huis – The Permanent Collection at Utrecht's Central Museum

1927 births
2017 deaths
Artists from Utrecht
Commanders of the Order of the Netherlands Lion
Dutch children's book illustrators
Dutch children's writers
Dutch graphic designers
Dutch illustrators
Writers who illustrated their own writing
Dutch expatriates in the United Kingdom
Dutch expatriates in France
Max Velthuijs Prize winners
Gouden Penseel winners